Smith's vole (Myodes smithii) is a species of rodent in the family Cricetidae. It is also known as Smith's red-backed vole and is found only in Japan.

This vole is named after Richard Gordon Smith, (1858–1918) who, after falling out with his wife, traveled the world hunting for animals and keeping a record of his travels and discoveries in eight large leather-bound diaries. He spent some time in Japan where he collected mammals for the British Museum, including the type specimen of this vole.

Taxonomy
There has been considerable discussion as to the phylogeny of this species. The molars grow continually during the animal's life and because of this trait, it was at one time placed in the genus Phaulomys. However, studies using mitochondrial and nuclear ribosomal DNA have shown that it is closely related to the Japanese and Asian species, Myodes rufocanus, and the Korean species, Myodes regulus and that there is no support for its inclusion in Phaulomys. The ever-growing molars in M. smithii are now believed to be independently derived from a rooted Myodes ancestor endemic to Japan.

Distribution
Smith's vole is found on the Japanese islands of Dogo, Honshu, Kyushu and Shikoku. Also at Oki and four cities and one town in the region of Mikawa.

Description
The color of Smith's vole varies from brownish-yellow to mid brown with the underparts a paler shade of brown. The body length is about 115 millimetres with a tail about 60 millimetres. The weight varies between 20 and 35 grams. The fur is dense and short, the muzzle blunt and the ears rounded.

Ecology
Smith's vole lives in forests, plantations and farmland in montane areas above about 400 metres.  It is absent from alluvial plains. It makes burrows in leaf litter and prefers damp conditions. It is a common species in chosen habitat but some of its populations are fragmented by road development, land reclamation, dam building and deforestation. The diet is entirely vegetarian and it feeds on the stems and leaves of green plants and on seeds. The breeding season varies in different locations and there may be one or two litters per year, each of one to six young, but usually two or three.

References

Musser, G. G. and M. D. Carleton. 2005. Superfamily Muroidea. pp. 894–1531 in Mammal Species of the World a Taxonomic and Geographic Reference. D. E. Wilson and D. M. Reeder eds. Johns Hopkins University Press, Baltimore.

Myodes
Mammals described in 1905
Taxa named by Oldfield Thomas
Endemic fauna of Japan
Mammals of Japan
Taxonomy articles created by Polbot